The Greek Psalter Incident was a moment in Latter-day Saint history when Henry Caswall reported to have asked Joseph Smith to translate an old Greek psalter he had in his possession on April 19, 1842, in Nauvoo. Before meeting with Joseph Smith, Caswall was already aware of the psalter's contents and intended to use the request as a means of exposing Joseph as a fraud.

History 
Henry Caswall wrote a book titled Three Days in Nauvoo (also called The City of the Mormons) in which he gives an account of presenting Joseph Smith with an old Greek psalter to translate. Caswall was aware of Smith's claims about the translation of The Book of Mormon from Reformed Egyptian and the Book of Abraham from Egyptian Papyri and wanted to test the truthfulness of these works. The Greek psalter's contents were well established prior to the meeting and contained a common Greek translation of the Psalms. After looking the manuscript over, Joseph Smith identified the manuscript as being a Dictionary of Egyptian Hieroglyphics and pointed to the capitalized letters saying that they were hieroglyphics followed by their meanings in Reformed Egyptian. Caswall went on to claim that this was evidence of Smith's position as a fraud. A local newspaper, The Warsaw Message, also mentioned the event and stated that multiple supporters of Smith were also present during the event. Smith was originally reluctant to look over the manuscript but after he claimed its connection to Egyptian hieroglyphics the room was in "great astonish". After the excitement in the room began to cool down, Caswall revealed that the contents of the manuscript was nothing more than a common Greek psalter. Smith then "stepped out" of the room.

Criticism of the event 
Joseph Smith may have had enough knowledge of the Greek language to avoid an incorrect identification of the Greek psalter. On November 20, 1835, Oliver Cowdery gifted Smith a Hebrew and Greek Lexicon. Smith also reported that he spent time studying the Greek language at home which would have been prior to his encounter with Henry Caswall.

References

Further reading
 
 

19th-century hoaxes
Hoaxes in the United States
Latter Day Saint movement in Illinois

1843 in Illinois
History of the Latter Day Saint movement
Mormonism-related controversies
Religious hoaxes